The Handley Page HP.52 Hampden is a British twin-engine medium bomber that was operated by the Royal Air Force (RAF). It was part of the trio of large twin-engine bombers procured for the RAF, joining the Armstrong Whitworth Whitley and Vickers Wellington.  The Hampden was powered by Bristol Pegasus radial engines but a variant known as the Handley Page Hereford had in-line Napier Daggers.

The Hampden served in the early stages of the Second World War, bearing the brunt of the early bombing war over Europe, taking part in the first night raid on Berlin and the first 1,000-bomber raid on Cologne. When it became obsolete, after a period of mainly operating at night, it was retired from RAF Bomber Command service in late 1942. By 1943, the rest of the trio were being superseded by the larger four-engined heavy bombers such as the Avro Lancaster.

Development

Origins
In 1932, the Air Ministry issued Specification B.9/32 seeking a twin-engined day bomber with higher performance than any preceding bomber aircraft. Handley Page and Vickers both designed aircraft to meet this specification, the Vickers design became the Wellington. The Handley Page design team, led by George Volkert, drafted a radical aircraft, initially centering upon the politically-favoured Rolls-Royce Goshawk engine. By mid-1934 development of the Goshawk looked less promising and the Air Ministry  relaxed the tare weight (unloaded weight) requirement of the specification, allowing for the use of heavier and more powerful radial engines such as the Bristol Perseus and Bristol Pegasus. According to aviation author Philip J.R. Moyes, the Handley Page design soon found support with the Air Ministry in part because it was judged to represent a fair compromise between range, payload, and speed.

During early 1936, the first prototype, designated as the HP.52 and given the serial number K4240, was completed. On seeing the narrow-yet-deep fuselage, which was only 3 ft wide, C. G. Grey, founder of The Aeroplane magazine, remarked "it looks like a flying suitcase", a nickname that stuck with the aircraft for its lifetime. On 21 June 1936, the prototype, powered by a pair of Bristol Pegasus P.E.5S(A) engines, conducted its maiden flight from Radlett Aerodrome, Hertfordshire, piloted by Handley-Page Chief Test Pilot Major James Cordes. In late June 1936, the prototype was put on public display in the New Types Park, Hendon Air Show, London. In August 1936, in response to the successful flight trials performed by K4240, the Air Ministry issued an initial production order for the type, ordering 180 production aircraft to be manufactured to meet Specification B.30/36; concurrently, a second order for 100 aircraft powered by the Napier Dagger was issued to Belfast-based Short & Harland.

In early 1937, a second prototype, which received the serial number L7271, was completed; this second prototype had several differences from the first, including the pitot tube being repositioned below the fuselage, a more rounded ventral defensive gun position, and a slightly modified nose. L7271 later received a pair of Dagger engines and was accordingly re-designated as the HP.53; on 1 July 1937, it performed its first flight after having received the new engines. Another prototype, L4032, was produced to serve as the production-standard prototype; on 24 June 1938, the third prototype conducted its maiden flight. L4032 differed from the previous two prototypes in that it was powered by a pair of Pegasus XVIII engines, the nose incorporated an optically-flat bomb-aiming panel, as well as the ventral and dorsal gun positions being revised.

On 24 June 1938, L4032 was officially christened by Lady Katharine Mary Montagu-Douglas-Scott, Viscountess Hampden (the aircraft was named after the Parliamentarian John Hampden), at a ceremony held in Radlett Aerodrome, the same day on which its first flight took place. L4032 and L4033, which was the second production-standard Hampden to be produced, would be later assigned to the Aeroplane and Armament Experimental Establishment at RAF Martlesham Heath, Suffolk. On 20 September 1938, the third production Hampden, designated L4034, following the completion of handling trials conducted by the Central Flying School at Upavon Aerodrome, Wiltshire, become the first aircraft to enter RAF squadron service, being delivered to No. 49 Squadron.

Production
By late 1938, the mass manufacturing plans for the Hampden had been formalised. In addition to Handley-Page's own production line, the type was to be built under subcontract by English Electric at their factory in Preston, Lancashire; on 6 August 1938, English Electric was awarded an initial contract to manufacture 75 Hampdens. In addition, Canadian interest in domestic production of the type had resulted in the establishment of the joint Anglo-Canadian Canadian Associated Aircraft company, which promptly received an initial order from the RAF for 80 Hampdens to be completed in Canada; this facility would effectively act as a shadow factory during wartime. On 1 September 1938, in response to interest expressed by the Royal Swedish Air Force (RSAF) in the Hampden, including in a potential licence production arrangement for 70 aircraft to be built in Sweden, a single production Hampden was supplied to Sweden. Designated P.5 by the RSAF, it was operated by the service through to November 1945, after which it was sold to Svenska Aeroplan AB (SAAB) to serve as a flying testbed before being retired in late 1947.

On 22 February 1940, the first Preston-built Hampden, P2062, conducted its maiden flight. English Electric would go on to manufacture a total of 770 Hampdens, more than any other company, prior to delivering its final aircraft on 15 March 1942. In July 1940, Handley-Page terminated its own production line for the Hampden upon the completion of its 500th aircraft. On 9 August 1940, the first Canadian-built Hampden, P5298, made its first flight; by October 1940, Canadian production had risen to 15 aircraft per month. A total of 160 Hampdens were completed by Canadian Associated Aircraft, many of which were ferried to the United Kingdom for wartime service. The final Canadian-built aircraft was delivered in late 1941.

Design
The Hampden Mk I had a pilot, navigator/bomb aimer, radio operator and rear gunner. Conceived as a fast, manoeuvrable "fighting bomber", the Hampden had a fixed forward-firing .303 in (7.7 mm) Browning machine gun in the upper part of the fuselage nose. To avoid the weight penalties of powered turrets, the Hampden had a curved Perspex nose fitted with a manual .303 in (7.7 mm) Vickers K machine gun and a .303 in (7.7 mm) Vickers K installation in the rear upper and lower positions. The layout was similar to the all-guns-forward cockpits introduced about the same time in Luftwaffe medium bombers, notably the Dornier Do 17. During the Norwegian Campaign, these guns proved to be thoroughly inadequate for self-defence in daylight; the single guns were replaced by twin Vickers K guns, a process led by Air Vice Marshal Arthur Harris of No. 5 Group RAF in 1940.

The Hampden had a flush-rivetted stressed skin, reinforced with a mixture of bent and extruded sections in an all-metal monocoque design. A split-assembly construction technique was employed: sections were prefabricated and then joined, to enable rapid and economic manufacture. The fuselage was in three big sections – front, centre and rear – that were built using jigs. The centre and rear sections were made of two halves, which meant that the sections could be fitted out in part under better working conditions prior to assembly. All possible assembly work was performed at the benches prior to installation upon each aircraft.

The wings were made up of three large units: centre section, port outer wing and starboard outer wing, which were also subdivided. Each section was built around a main girder spar, leading edge section and trailing edge section. The wing made use of wingtip slots and hydraulically-actuated trailing edge flaps; the flaps and ailerons had stress-bearing D-spars.

The Hampden's flying qualities were typically described as being favourable; Moyes described it as being "extraordinarily mobile on the controls". Pilots were provided with a high level of external visibility, assisting the execution of steep turns and other manoeuvres. The control layout required some familiarisation, as some elements such as the hydraulic controls were unobtrusive and unintuitive. Upon introduction, the Hampden exhibited greater speeds and initial climb rates than any of its contemporaries while still retaining favourable handling qualities.

The slim and compact fuselage of the aircraft was quite cramped, being wide enough only for a single person. The navigator sat behind the pilot and access in the cockpit required folding down the seats. Once in place, the crew had almost no room to move and were typically uncomfortable during long missions. Aircrews referred to the Hampden by various nicknames due to this, such as Flying Suitcase, Panhandle, and Flying Tadpole.

The newest of the three medium bombers, the Hampden was often referred to by aircrews as the "Flying Suitcase" because of its cramped crew conditions, or more plausibly, because of the unusually thin, deep, slab-sided and rectangular shape of the fuselage was reminiscent of that of a suitcase.

Operational history

UK service

In September 1938, No. 49 Squadron received the first Hampdens; by the end of the year, both 49 and 83 Squadrons at RAF Scampton had re-equipped with the type. A total of 226 Hampdens were in service with ten squadrons by the start of the Second World War, with six forming the operational strength of 5 Group of Bomber Command based in Lincolnshire.

With the outbreak of war in 1939, Hampdens were initially used to perform armed aerial reconnaissance missions, observing German naval activity during daylight. However, despite its speed and manoeuvrability, the Hampden proved to be no match for Luftwaffe fighters; in December 1939, Bomber Command is claimed to have discarded the belief that aircraft such as the Hampden could realistically operate by day and instead chose to predominantly employ them under the cover of darkness during nighttime operations. During 1940, Hampdens of 5 Group conducted 123 nighttime airborne leaflet propaganda missions, losing only a single aircraft in the process.

On 13 April 1940, days after Germany's invasion of Norway, a large number of Hampdens were dispatched on night-time mine-laying (code-named "gardening") flights in the North Sea in areas deemed unapproachable by British shipping. According to Moyes, this activity proved highly effective, experiencing a low casualty rate of less than 1.9 aircraft per mission. The Hampden also saw a return to its use as a daytime bomber during the Norwegian Campaign, but quickly proved to be under-gunned in the face of German fighters.

On 19 March 1940, Hampdens took part in the first deliberate bombing of German soil in a nighttime raid upon the seaplane hangars and slipways in Hörnum, Sylt. The type continued to operate at night on bombing raids over Germany. Flight Lieutenant Rod Learoyd of 49 Squadron was awarded the Victoria Cross for a low-level attack on the Dortmund-Ems canal on 12 August 1940 where two of five aircraft failed to return. On 25 August 1940, Hampdens from various squadrons participated in the RAF's first bombing raid on Berlin. Sergeant John Hannah was the wireless operator/air gunner of an 83 Squadron Hampden and was awarded the Victoria Cross on 15 September 1940, when he fought the flames of the burning aircraft, allowing the pilot to return it to base.

In April 1942, the Hampden-equipped 144 Squadron and 455 Squadron RAAF were transferred from Bomber Command to Coastal Command to perform the torpedo bomber role. Later that year, detachments from both squadrons were dispatched to Vaenga airfield, Murmansk, Russia, to help safeguard the Arctic convoys in the vicinity. A total of four squadrons assigned to Coastal Command would be equipped with Hampdens. These squadrons continued to use the type into late 1943; the last Coastal Command squadron transitioned from the type on 10 December 1943.

Almost half of the Hampdens built, 714, were lost on operations, with 1,077 crew killed and 739 reported as missing. German Flak accounted for 108, one hit a German barrage balloon, 263 Hampdens crashed because of "a variety of causes" and 214 others were classed as "missing". Luftwaffe pilots claimed 128 Hampdens, shooting down 92 at night.

The last Bomber Command sorties by Hampdens were flown on the night of 14/15 September 1942 by 408 Squadron, RCAF against Wilhelmshaven. After being withdrawn from Bomber Command in 1942, it operated with RAF Coastal Command through 1943 as a long-range torpedo bomber (the Hampden TB Mk I with a Mk XII torpedo in an open bomb bay and a  bomb under each wing) and as a maritime reconnaissance aircraft.

Non-UK service

The Hampden was also used by the Royal Canadian Air Force (RCAF), Royal Australian Air Force (RAAF), Royal New Zealand Air Force (RNZAF), Aviatsiya Voenno-Morskogo Flota (AV-MF: Maritime Military Fleet Aviation) of the Soviet Union and the Swedish Flygvapnet (Air Force).

The Hampden in RCAF service included the 160 examples manufactured in Canada by the Canadian Associated Aircraft consortium. Of the total built, 84 were shipped by sea to Great Britain, while the remainder came to Patricia Bay (Victoria Airport) B.C., to set up No. 32 OTU (RAF) used for bombing and gunnery training. Typical exercises at 32 OTU consisted of patrolling up the West Coast of Vancouver Island at night or flying out into the Pacific to a navigational map co-ordinate, often in adverse and un-forecast inclement weather. Due to attrition from accidents, about 200 "war weary" Hampdens were later flown from the U.K. to Patricia Bay as replacements.

In Operation Orator, during September 1942, the crews of 32 Hampden TB.1 torpedo bombers from No. 144 Squadron RAF and No. 455 Squadron RAAF flew to Northwest Russia, to protect arctic convoy PQ 18 from German surface vessels, such the battleship Tirpitz. The Hampden crews flew from Sumburgh in the Shetland Islands to Vaenga (Vayenga; later known as Severomorsk) in Murmansk Oblast, Russia. Eight Hampdens were lost or damaged beyond repair en route. 144 and 455 Squadrons flew a small number of sorties from Vaenga. While it was originally intended that the Hampdens would be flown back to Scotland, the prevailing west-east headwinds on such a flight might have pushed the Hampdens beyond their maximum endurance and it was decided to transport the wing's personnel back to Britain by sea and gift the Hampdens to the Soviet Navy.

Aircrews and mechanics from Maritime Military Fleet Aviation (Aviatsiya Voenno-Morskogo Flota; VMF) were trained by members of 144 and 455 Squadrons, before their return to Britain in October. The 3rd Squadron, 24th Mine-Torpedo Aviation Regiment (24 Минно-торпедный авиаполк; 24 MTAP) operated the "balalaika" – the Russian nickname for the Hampden, in reference to its unusual shape – until mid-1943, when losses, a lack of replacements and a shortage of spares forced its retirement. 24 MTAP then reverted to the Ilyushin DB-3/Ilyushin Il-4.

In Sweden, the Flygvapnet assigned an HP.52 to Reconnaissance Wing F 11 at Nyköping for evaluation, under the designation P5. After the war, the aircraft was sold to SAAB where it was used as an avionics testbed.

Variants
The Hampden was powered by two  Bristol Pegasus XVIII nine-cylinder radial engines. A Mk II variant, designated the HP.62, was developed by converting two Hampdens to use the  Wright Cyclone engine in 1940, but no further work was done on that project.

Interest in the HP.52 by the Swedish Air Force led to the creation of the HP.53 prototype, which was subsequently used as a testbed for a pair of  Napier Dagger VIII 24-cylinder H-block air-cooled inline engines.

In August 1936, the Air Ministry placed an order for 100 Hampdens equipped with the Dagger engine. Those aircraft subsequently received the designation HP.53, along with the name Hereford. Manufactured by Short & Harland in Belfast, their performance was almost identical to that of their Hampden cousins, but there were problems with the engines. The Dagger engine proved to be noisy and unreliable. Cooling problems plagued the engine while being run on the ground, resulting in distortions and premature failures. The problems were not satisfactorily resolved, with the result that most of the Herefords on order were converted to Hampdens, while those that were constructed were often re-engined to become Hampdens. A limited number of Herefords did enter squadron service but were only used as crew trainers by training units.

Operators

Hampden

 Royal Australian Air Force
 No. 455 Squadron RAAF Used between July 1941 and December 1943, Codeletters UB.

 Royal Canadian Air Force
 No. 408 (Goose) Squadron RCAF Used with RAF Bomber Command between July 1941 and September 1942, Codeletters EQ
 No. 415 (Swordfish) Squadron RCAF Used as a torpedo bomber with RAF Coastal Command between February 1942 and November 1943, Codeletters GX
 No. 420 (Snowy Owl) Squadron RCAF Used with RAF Bomber Command between December 1941 and August 1942, Codeletters PT
 No. 32 Operational Training Unit RAF/RCAF Used in Canada between May 1942 and February 1944, Codeletters DK, LB, OP and RO

 Royal New Zealand Air Force
 No. 489 Squadron RNZAF Used between February 1942 and November 1943, Codeletters XA

 Soviet Naval Aviation
 24th Mine-Torpedo Aviation Regiment (24 MTAP)

 Swedish Air Force
 Reconnaissance Wing F 11 based at Nyköping operated a single HP.52 for evaluation under designation P 5. After the war, the aircraft was sold to SAAB where it was operated for testing avionics.

 Royal Air Force
 No. 7 Squadron RAF  – April 1939 to April 1940, code letters LT (pre-war) and MG (wartime)
 No. 44 Squadron RAF – February 1939 and December 1941, code letters JW (pre-war) and KM (wartime)
 No. 49 Squadron RAF – October 1938 and April 1942, code letters XU (pre-war) and EA (wartime)
 No. 50 Squadron RAF – December 1938 and April 1942, code letters QX (pre-war) and VN (wartime)
 No. 61 Squadron RAF – February 1939 and October 1941, code letters LS (pre-war) and QR (wartime)
 No. 76 Squadron RAF – March 1939 and April 1940, code letters NM (pre-war) and MP (wartime)
 No. 83 Squadron RAF – November 1938 and January 1942, code letters QQ (pre-war) and OL (wartime)
 No. 97 Squadron RAF – July/August 1941, squadron code OF
 No. 106 Squadron RAF – March 1939 to March 1942, code letters XS (pre-war) and ZN (wartime)
 No. 144 Squadron RAF – March 1939 to October 1942, code letters NV (pre-war) and PL (wartime)
 No. 185 Squadron RAF – June 1939 to April 1940, code letters ZM (pre-war) and GL (wartime)
 No. 207 Squadron RAF – July/August 1941, squadron code EM
 No. 517 Squadron RAF – August to November 1943,
 No. 519 Squadron RAF – August to November 1943, code letters Z9
 No. 521 Squadron RAF – September to December 1943, code letters 5O
 No. 5 (C)OTU RAF Used between July 1942 and September 1943, Only individual code letters and numbers
 No. 14 Operational Training Unit RAF Used between 5 May 1940 and December 1942, code letters AM, GL and VB
 No. 16 Operational Training Unit RAF Used between 18 April 1940 and September 1942, code letters GA, JS and XG
 No. 25 Operational Training Unit RAF Used between February and December 1941, code letters ZP
 No. 1401 (Meteorological) Flight RAF at RAF Bircham Newton/RAF Docking
 No. 1402 (Meteorological) Flight RAF at Aldergrove
 No. 1403 (Meteorological) Flight RAF at Gosport/Bircham Newton/Gibraltar
 No. 1404 (Meteorological) Flight RAF at St. Eval
 No. 1406 (Meteorological) Flight RAF at Wick
 No. 1407 (Meteorological) Flight RAF at Reykjavik

Hereford

 Royal Air Force
 No. 185 Squadron RAF at Cottesmore used in April 1940.
 No. 14 Operational Training Unit at Cottesmore used from April 1940.
 No. 16 Operational Training Unit at Upper Heyford, Oxfordshire, used from 7 May 1940.
 Torpedo Development Unit at Gosport operated one aircraft.

Survivors

No Hampdens remain in flying condition today, although examples do remain on display or undergoing restoration:

Hampden I P1344
Recovered from a crash-site in Russia in 1991, the aircraft is being reconstructed at the Michael Beetham Conservation Centre at the Royal Air Force Museum Cosford. During the Second World War, it served with No. 144 Squadron RAF, part of Coastal Command. In September 1942, the squadron was transferred to the Kola Peninsula in northern Russia to help protect the Arctic convoys. While in transit over Finland, P1344 accidentally flew close by a German airfield and was shot down by two scrambled Messerschmitt Bf 109s. It crashed in a wooded area of the Kola Peninsula, with three crew members killed and two taken prisoner. After its recovery by another party, the RAF Museum gained ownership of the aircraft in 1992. It was reported in 2016 that, with the help of volunteers, work on the fuselage could be completed by 2018.
An update in October 2020 stated that "aircraft now has all four fuselage components fully assembled, attached and painted in its original 144 Squadron colour scheme and serial number". It was expected to be moved to the RAF Museum London.

Hampden, P5436
 This aircraft has been reconstructed largely from parts of the last Canadian-built example, ditched on a training flight in November 1942 when the pilot lost control after a practice torpedo drop. The remains were recovered from 600 ft of water in Saanich Inlet on Vancouver Island in 1989. Along with recovered components from two other Hampden crashes in Canada, reconstruction was about 97 per cent complete by 2007. The restored aircraft became the showpiece exhibit at the Canadian Museum of Flight at Langley, British Columbia, in the Fraser Valley, east of Vancouver.
In January 2009, a heavy snowfall snapped off the aircraft's left wing. Despite the efforts of Museum staff to clear the accumulating snow, the wing's internal structure failed and the wing separated from the fuselage, falling onto a display case containing one of the aircraft's original engines. The wing suffered considerable damage and there was additional damage to the tail and propeller. The wing had largely been restored using wood parts because most of the metal parts of the wing structure had corroded so it did not possess the structural integrity of the original aircraft. The museum is currently seeking donations to repair the aircraft. The repairs, in 2011, included the mating of the wing and propeller to the fuselage and engine. As of November 2013, the repairs to the CMF Handley Page Hampden have been completed. The wing has been re-secured and the complete aircraft has been repainted. By 20 April 2015 the two gunner sections were open.

The Wings Aviation Museum in the United Kingdom owns the wings and tail of "P1273"; the Lincolnshire Aviation Heritage Centre is currently restoring AE436 to flying condition. Both of these were also 144 Squadron aircraft, lost during the transfer to Russia. The former, "P1273" was shot down by mistake by Soviet fighters over Petsamo. The latter was lost over Sweden, its remains discovered in a remote region by hikers in 1976.

In popular culture
The HP Hampden had a featured role in The Big Blockade, a 1941 Second World War propaganda film showing "blockade" bombing and its effects on the German war industry, with Michael Rennie and John Mills as two of its four-man crew. The trials of flying Hampdens in the early years of the Second World War are also described in the 2002 novel Damned Good Show by Derek Robinson. There is also an issue of the comic Combat about a Hampden and its crew.

Guy Gibson's autobiography, Enemy Coast Ahead (1946), details his early RAF flying career in a Hampden squadron in text and photographs.

Robert Kee's war memoir, A Crowd Is Not Company, begins by describing the mission in which he was shot down in a Hampden while trying to drop a sea mine off the coast of the Netherlands.

Richard Wicker's war memoir, We Happy Few (Troubador, 2019), describes his experience as operator/gunner in Hampden bombers in summer 1940. He was shot down during a bombing raid near Cologne, Germany, on 29th August 1940. Wicker and two other crew survived and were taken POW, but pilot Cedric Dunkels was killed.

Specifications (Hampden Mk I)

See also

References

Notes

Bibliography
 Barnes, C.H. and Derek N. James. Handley Page Aircraft since 1907. London: Putnam & Company, 1987. .
 Bowyer, Chaz. Hampden Special. Shepperton, Surrey, UK: Ian Allan Ltd., 1976. .
 Clayton, Donald C. Handley Page, an Aircraft Album. Shepperton, Surrey, UK: Ian Allan Ltd., 1969. .
 Crosby, Francis. The World Encyclopedia of Bombers. London: Anness Publishing Ltd., 2007. .
 Day, Jerry. "Hurt Hampden." Air Classics, Volume 45, Issue 4, April 2009
 Donald, David and Jon Lake, eds. Encyclopedia of World Military Aircraft. London: AIRtime Publishing, 1996. .
 Green, William. Famous Bombers of the Second World War. London: Macdonald and Jane's Publishers Ltd., 1977. .
 Green, William and Gordon Swanborough. WW2 Aircraft Fact Files: RAF Bombers, Part 2. London: Jane's Publishing Company Ltd., 2nd edition revised 1981. .
 Gunston, Bill. Classic World War II Aircraft Cutaways. London: Osprey, 1995. .
 "Hampden: Defender of Liberty". Air International, Vol. 27, No. 5, November 1984. pp. 244–252.
 Mondey, David. The Hamlyn Concise Guide to British Aircraft of World War II. London: Hamlyn/Aerospace, 1982. .
 Moyes, Philip J.R. Bomber Squadrons of the RAF and their Aircraft. London: Macdonald and Jane's, 1964 (2nd edition 1976). .
 Moyes, Philip J.R. The Handley Page Hampden (Aircraft in Profile 58). Leatherhead, Surrey, UK: Profile Publications Ltd., 1965.
 Moyes, Philip J.R. Royal Air Force Bombers of World War Two, Volume Two. Chalfont St. Giles, Buckinghamshire, UK: Hylton Lacy Publishers, 1968. .
 Moyle, Harry. The Hampden File. Tonbridge, UK: Air-Britain (Historians) Ltd., 1989. .
 Postlethwaite, Mark. Hampden Squadrons in Focus. Walton on Thames, UK: Red Kite, 2003. .
 Richards, Denis. The Hardest Victory: RAF Bomber Command in the Second World War. London: Cornet, 1995. .
 
 Roberts, Nicholas. Crash Log: Handley Page Hampden & Hereford. Earl Shilton, Leicestershire, UK: Midland Counties Publications, 1980. .
 Thetford, Owen. Aircraft of the Royal Air Force 1918–1957. London: Putnam, 1957.
 
 Eden, Paul (Ed.). Encyclopedia of Aircraft of World War II. London: Amber Books, 2004. .

External links

 
 
 
 
 Hampden at the Canadian Museum of Flight

1930s British bomber aircraft
World War II British bombers
Hampden
Aircraft first flown in 1936
Mid-wing aircraft
Twin piston-engined tractor aircraft